The Bold Ruler Stakes  is a Grade III American Thoroughbred horse race for three-years-old and older run over a distance of seven furlongs run annually in late October Belmont Park in Elmont, New York. The event currently offers a purse of $200,000.

History

The race is named for U.S. Racing Hall of Fame inductee and 1957 US Horse of the Year, Bold Ruler.

The event was inaugurated on 22 December 1976 at Aqueduct Racetrack at a distance of six furlongs and was won by Chief Tamanaco who was ridden by US Hall of Fame jockey Angel Cordero Jr. and trained by the young trainer James Iselin, son of Philip H. Iselin who at the time was Chairman of Monmouth Park Racetrack in a time of 1:09.

In 1978 the event was scheduled to be run in early spring in April and it was raced at that time of the year until 2002. That year the event was moved to Belmont Park and held in May and was duly held then until 2009. In 2009 the event was moved to the Aqueduct Fall Meeting and has been held in late October or early November and at times returning to be scheduled at Belmont Park.

In 1982 the event was classified as Grade III, upgraded to Grade II in 1985 for five runnings before being downgraded back to Grade III in 1990.

In the 1998 running, Kelly Kip, ridden by Jean-Luc Samyn, set an Aqueduct rack record of 1:07.61 for the six furlongs distance. Samyn and Kelly Kip returned the following year to break that record, running the six furlongs in 1:07.54.

In 2009 the Bold Ruler was increased in distance to 7 furlongs.

In 2019 Maximum Security set a new stakes record for the seven furlong distance en route to being crowned the US Champion Three-Year-Old Male Horse.

In 2022 the conditions of the event were changed to a stakes race with allowances. Also the event in 2022 was moved to Aqueduct Racetrack due to infield tunnel and redevelopment work at Belmont Park and run at a shorter distance of six furlongs.

Records
Speed record:
7 furlongs:  1:20.76 – Maximum Security (2019)
6 furlongs:  1:07.54 – Kelly Kip (1999)

Margins:
 lengths – No Dozing (2018)

Most wins:
 2 – Dave's Friend (1980, 1981)
 2 – Kelly Kip (1998, 1999)

Most wins by a jockey:
 3 – Ángel Cordero Jr. (1976, 1985, 1987)
 3 – Jean-Luc Samyn (1977, 1998, 1999)
 3 – John R. Velazquez (1994, 2001, 2010)
 3 – Jose Lezcano (2009, 2011, 2013)

Most wins by a trainer:
 4 – H. Allen Jerkens (1995, 1998, 1999, 2009)

Most wins by an owner:
 3 – Hobeau Farm (1995, 1998, 1999)

Winners

Notes:

§ Ran as an entry

See also
List of American and Canadian Graded races

References

Graded stakes races in the United States
Grade 3 stakes races in the United States
Open sprint category horse races
Horse races in New York (state)
Recurring sporting events established in 1976
Belmont Park
1976 establishments in New York (state)